Sentaku may refer to:

Choices (Buffy the Vampire Slayer), episode whose Japanese title is romanised as "Sentaku"
"Sentaku",  a chapter of the manga Suzuka
"Sentaku",  a chapter of the manga Soul Eater
"Sentaku",  an episode of the anime television series Death Note
"Sentaku",  an episode of the anime television series Nabari
"Sentaku",  an episode of the anime television series Simoun
"Sentaku",  an episode of the anime television series xxxHolic